Peter Castrikum (born 19 February 1943) is  a former Australian rules footballer who played with Footscray in the Victorian Football League (VFL).

Notes

External links 		
		
		
					
		
Living people		
1943 births		
		
Australian rules footballers from Victoria (Australia)		
Western Bulldogs players
Melton Football Club players